Pribaoutki is a cycle of four songs composed by Igor Stravinsky in 1914 to Russian texts by Alexander Afanasyev. Its Russian title has no direct English equivalent, although Richard Taruskin suggests "nonsense rhymes" or "jingles." (The French subtitle appearing in the score, is descriptive, not a translation.) Pribaoutki takes about four minutes to perform.

Songs
The titles of the four songs are:
 "Kornílo" ("Uncle Kornilo")
 "Natashka" ("Little Natalie")
 "Polkovnik" ("The Colonel")
 "Starets i zayats" ("The Old Man and the Hare")

Instrumentation
Pribaoutki is written for low voice and instrumental ensemble. Stravinsky is said to have preferred a male singer, although the work is commonly performed by mezzo-soprano or contralto. The eight-member ensemble consists of: flute, oboe (doubling English horn), clarinet, bassoon, violin, viola, cello, and double bass.

History
Pribaoutki was composed between June and September 1914, just as World War I was breaking out. During this time, Stravinsky was living in Switzerland: at Salvan during the summer, and Clarens in September.

Premières
Pribaoutki was first heard in Paris (Salle des Agriculteurs) on November 20, 1918, in a program that also included the Berceuses du chat; both works were accompanied by piano in this performance.  The first performance with instrumental ensemble was given in Vienna on June 6, 1919, at a concert of Arnold Schoenberg's Society for Private Musical Performances (Verein für musikalische Privataufführungen).  Again, the program also included the Berceuses du chat.

References

External links
  Full score. (Geneva: Ad. Henn, 1917).
 

Compositions by Igor Stravinsky
Classical song cycles
1914 compositions